Ilyashenko, Iliashenko, or Iliașenco is an East Slavic surname. Notable people with the surname include:

 Kirill Ilyashenko (1915–1980), Moldovan politician
 Pavel Ilyashenko (born 1990), Kazakhstani pentathlete
 Yulij Ilyashenko (born 1943), Russian mathematician

See also
 

Ukrainian-language surnames